The Capture of the schooner Fancy was a famous British victory over two pirate ships under Captain Edward Low. When off Delaware Bay Low attacked a Royal Navy man-of-war which he mistook for a whaler. The resulting combat lasted several hours and ended with the capture of one pirate vessel. In fact, the captured vessel was not the one named Fancy - factually, the combat should have been called "Capture of the sloop Ranger."

Background
Edward Low was an eighteenth-century pirate from New England known for his extreme cruelty. He personally killed over fifty men and committed several atrocities such as forcing prisoners he captured to cannibalism. By summer of 1723 Low commanded the eighty-ton schooner named Fancy and was the most feared pirate in the Atlantic, so the British dispatched several warships on counter-piracy patrols. Accompanying Fancy was the sloop-of-war  under Captain Charles Harris. Fancy was armed with ten guns and had a crew of forty-four, many of whom were forced into service. Ranger was a former French sloop which was captured by Low off Grenada earlier in 1723. Her armament and number of crew is not known. Some accounts cite Low as having commanded the sloop  during the encounter with the British post ship  under Captain Peter Solgard. The sixth rate mounted a twenty gun armament and a complement of about 120 officers and crewmen.

Capture
Low was headed due northwest from the Azores to attack shipping off the British North American colonies. Searching for Low was HMS Greyhound. While cruising off Delaware Bay's mouth, Low and his pirates sighted the man-of-war and gave chase. Low hoisted his Jolly Roger fully suspecting his prey to be an English whaler but when the pirates drew near, HMS Greyhound revealed herself with the raising of her colors and released a broadside into the Fancy as the pirates were preparing for boarding.

Low's schooner took damage and began returning shot while Harris in Ranger maneuvered into firing position. Ranger opened fire briefly with her guns but after only a few minutes both the sloop and schooner chose to flee. A running battle then continued for several hours. Fancy was dismasted by well-placed cannon fire but escaped, while Captain Harris in Ranger was defeated. Wind was not in favor of the pirates, so they used oars to help steer their ships away from the British. The use of oars proved to be pointless when the faster Greyhound came alongside Ranger and the two crews began skirmishing with small arms. Grappling hooks were thrown and the British sailors boarded the sloop. After a few more moments of intense close-quarters combat the pirates surrendered and were taken prisoner. Captain Low's schooner Fancy is said to have carried around £150,000 in gold during the engagement.

Aftermath
Thirty-seven white and six black pirates were captured. Twenty-five of these, including the young Harris, were hung near Newport, Rhode Island on June 19, 1723. Captain Solgard became famous in New York City and in England and also received prize money for the sloop he captured which also carried gold during the time of battle. Solgard eventually rose to the rank of admiral in the Royal Navy. Ned Low continued his life of piracy and took several more ships, including a 22-gun French man-of-war. Depictions of his later career give the impressions that he grew more cruel after his defeat, particularly to his English captives. Circumstances of his death are unknown, though he perished sometime in 1724.

References

 

Naval battles involving pirates
Piracy in the Atlantic Ocean
Naval battles involving Great Britain
Conflicts in 1723
Anti-piracy battles involving the United Kingdom